Shahu II (born 7 January 1948) (hereditary titles: Shrimant Kshatriyakulavatans Shree Raja Shahu Chhatrapati Hindupad - Patshaha, Maharaj Sarkar Karvir) of the Bhonsle dynasty of the Marathas. He became the ceremonial Chhatrapati Maharaja of Kolhapur in 1983. He is the 12th direct descendant of King Shivaji.

See also
 Maratha Empire
 List of Maratha dynasties and states
 List of Indian princely states

Sources

Maharajas of Kolhapur
1948 births
Living people